This is a list of the main career statistics of Serbian professional tennis player, Ana Ivanovic. Ivanovic won fifteen WTA singles titles including one grand slam singles title at the 2008 French Open and three WTA Tier I singles titles. She was also the runner-up at the 2007 French Open and 2008 Australian Open and a semi-finalist at the 2007 Wimbledon Championships and 2007 WTA Tour Championships. On June 9, 2008, Ivanovic became the world No. 1 for the first time in her career.

Career achievements 

Ivanovic reached her first grand slam singles quarterfinal at the 2005 French Open, defeating third seed Amélie Mauresmo en route before losing in straight sets to seventh seed, Nadia Petrova. The following year, Ivanovic won her first major title at the 2006 Rogers Cup, defeating former world No. 1 Martina Hingis in the final in straight sets. Ivanovic subsequently won the US Open Series that year.

In January 2007, Ivanovic recorded her first win over a reigning world No. 1 at the Toray Pan Pacific Open when Maria Sharapova retired whilst down a set in their semi-final match. In May 2007, Ivanovic cracked the top ten of the WTA rankings for the first time in her career, rising to a then career high of world No. 8 after winning the Qatar Telecom German Open by defeating world No. 4 Svetlana Kuznetsova in three sets in the final. At the 2007 French Open, Ivanovic reached her first grand slam singles final, defeating Kuznetsova in the quarterfinals and world No. 2 Maria Sharapova in the semi-finals before losing in straight sets to world No. 1 and two-time defending champion Justine Henin in the final. At the 2007 Wimbledon Championships, Ivanovic reached her second consecutive grand slam singles semi-final but lost in straight sets to the eventual champion, Venus Williams. Later that year, Ivanovic won her fourth career singles title at the East West Bank Classic and as a result, achieved a new career high singles ranking of world No. 4. Ivanovic's results throughout the year allowed her to qualify for the year-ending WTA Tour Championships for the first time in her career. She progressed to the semi-finals where she lost in straight sets to the world No. 1 Justine Henin. Ivanovic finished the year ranked world No. 4, the best year-end ranking of her career.

In January 2008, Ivanovic reached her first Australian Open final and second grand slam singles final overall but lost in straight sets to Maria Sharapova. However, Ivanovic achieved a new career high singles ranking of world No. 2 following the event. Later that year, Ivanovic reached her third grand slam singles final by defeating Jelena Janković in three sets in the semi-finals and thus ensured that she would become the world No. 1 for the first time in her career. Ivanovic then defeated first-time grand slam singles finalist Dinara Safina in the final in straight sets to win her first and only grand slam singles title.

At the 2012 US Open, Ivanovic defeated Tsvetana Pironkova in the fourth round, dropping just four games to reach her first US Open quarterfinal and her first grand slam singles quarterfinal since 2008. With this achievement, Ivanovic reached the quarterfinals or better at all four grand slam events.

In 2014, Ivanovic enjoyed a resurgence and attained a number of career-best achievements. She began the year by winning her first title in three years at the ASB Classic, defeating former world No. 1 Venus Williams in three sets before upsetting the reigning world No. 1 Serena Williams en route to her second Australian Open quarterfinal where she lost in three sets to thirtieth seed, Eugenie Bouchard. During the clay court season, Ivanovic reached her third final of the year at the Porsche Tennis Grand Prix, losing to two-time defending champion Maria Sharapova; the quarterfinals of the Mutua Madrid Open and the semi-finals of the Internazionali BNL d'Italia, defeating Sharapova for the first time since 2007 en route but was ultimately upset by Lucie Šafářová in the third round of the French Open. She rebounded by winning her first career singles title on grass at the Aegon Classic before reaching the final of the Western & Southern Open (her first top tier Premier final since 2009) and thus returned to the top ten of the WTA rankings for the first time in five years as a result. In September, Ivanovic reached her sixth singles final of the year (a new career-best) at the Toray Pan Pacific Open, where she defeated Caroline Wozniacki to claim her fourth title of the season, the most titles she won in a single season.

Performance timelines

Only Main Draw results in WTA Tour, Grand Slam Tournaments, Fed Cup and Olympic Games are included in win–loss records.

Singles

Doubles

Grand Slam tournament finals

Singles: 3 (1 title, 2 runner-ups)

Other significant finals

Tier I / Premier Mandatory & Premier 5 finals

Singles: 6 (3 titles, 3 runner-ups)

Year-end championships finals

Singles: 2 (2 titles)

WTA career finals

Singles: 23 (15 titles, 8 runner-ups)

Doubles: 1 (1 runner-up)

Team competition: 2 (2 runner-ups)

Double bagel matches (6-0, 6-0)

Fed Cup

Singles: 24 (17–7)

Doubles: 5 (3–2)

ITF Circuit finals
Since Ivanovic's professional debut in August 2003 she won five ITF titles and played in one more final.

Singles: 6 (5 titles, 1 runner–up)

Junior Grand Slam finals

Singles: 1 (1 runner-up)

WTA Tour career earnings

Best Grand Slam results

Record against other players
Ivanovic's match record against certain players who have been ranked world No. 10 or higher. Active players are in boldface:

Top 10 wins

Notable exhibitions

Team competitions

Notes

References 

Ivanovic, Ana